Skuhrov is a municipality and village in Jablonec nad Nisou District in the Liberec Region of the Czech Republic. It has about 600 inhabitants.

Administrative parts
The village of Huntířov is an administrative part of Skuhrov.

Notable people
Marek Štryncl (born 1974), cellist and conductor

References

Villages in Jablonec nad Nisou District